Jose "Pepe" Correa is a boxing trainer who has trained Sugar Ray Leonard, Roberto Durán, Lennox Lewis, Simon Brown and Maurice Blocker. He was one of the trainers on the 3rd season of the boxing reality TV series, The Contender, premiering September 4, 2007 on ESPN.

References

Year of birth missing (living people)
Living people
Boxing trainers
American male boxers